Knockroosky   is a townland in the parish of Aughagower and barony of Burrishoole, County Mayo.  It is bordered to the west by Ballinvoy, to the northwest by Meneen, to the north by Dooncastle and Cushinkeel, to the northeast  by Cushinsheeaun, to the east by Mace North and Mace South, and to the southwest by the Deerpark. All of these are in the parish of Aughagower. The R330 road runs through Knockroosky. The national school for the parish Aughagower is situated to the north of this road.

References 

Townlands of County Mayo